Basil Scarsella is an Italo-Australian businessman. He is a former CEO of ETSA Utilities and Northern Gas Networks. He is the current CEO of UK Power Networks, formerly EDF Energy Networks. He was also President of the Oceania Football Confederation between 2000 and 2003, and is a former Member of the Executive Committee of FIFA.

Early life
Born in September 1955 near Rome, Scarsella moved to Australia from Italy in the early 1960s.

Working life
Scarsella was CEO of ETSA Utilities in Adelaide, South Australia.

Between 2005 and 2011 Scarsella was CEO of Northern Gas Networks, a company that manages the gas distribution network in the north of England.

Football

Playing career
Scarsella played as a goalkeeper for Campbelltown City.

Administration
After finishing playing he entered football administration, becoming chairman of Soccer Australia.

Scarsella was President of the Oceania Football Confederation (OFC) in the early 2000s when FIFA promised and subsequently reneged on direct entry for the top OFC team to the World Cup finals tournament. In 2003, he resigned after OFC members passed a vote of no confidence in his leadership.

In 2003 Scarsella became inaugural president of National Soccer League club Adelaide United.

Honours
 Life member of Campbelltown City SC
 Football Federation Australia - Football Hall of Fame Hall of Honour – Inducted 2001

References

Australian businesspeople
Australian soccer chairmen and investors
Living people
Year of birth missing (living people)